Utpal Shashikant Tatu (born 12 May 1964) is an Indian molecular biologist, biochemist and a professor and Chairman of the department of biochemistry of the Indian Institute of Science. He is known for his research on infectious disease such as malaria and other neglected tropical diseases of global relevance. Tatu is an elected fellow of the Indian Academy of Sciences. The Department of Biotechnology of the Government of India awarded him the National Bioscience Award for Career Development, one of the highest Indian science awards, for his contributions to biosciences in 2008. Tatu is a proponent of the One Health approach. The 'One Health' approach advocates designing and implementing strategies, policies and carrying out scientific research which involves collaboration between multiple sectors that will lead to major public health outcomes.

Biography 

Utpal Tatu, born on 12 May 1964, he secured a PhD from the Indian Institute of Science (IISc). Later, completed his post doctorate research at Yale University in New Haven, Connecticut.  Subsequently, he joined the IISc as a faculty at the Division of Biological Sciences and holds the position of a professor. He heads Prof. Utpal Tatu's Lab where he hosts many post-doctoral and doctoral researchers as well as scientists. He is known for his research on malaria and the biology of molecular chaperones and his team is involved in finding new drug delivery protocols to fight the disease. Tatu's studies have been documented by way of a number of articles and the online article repository of the Indian Academy of Sciences has listed 20 of them. He also serves as an editor of the Newsletter of the Proteomics Society, India.

Tatu is a global health expert focusing on improving the methods of diagnosis and treatment of neglected infectious diseases.

The Department of Biotechnology of the Government of India awarded Tatu the National Bioscience Award for Career Development, one of the highest Indian science awards in 2008. The Indian Academy of Sciences elected him as a fellow in 2012.

Selected scientific publications

See also 

 Protozoan parasite
 Plasmodium falciparum

Notes

References

External links 
 

N-BIOS Prize recipients
Indian scientific authors
Living people
Academic staff of the Indian Institute of Science
1964 births
Scientists from Karnataka
Indian molecular biologists
Indian biochemists
Indian medical researchers